Over the Sun is the fourth album by Melbourne folk band Tinpan Orange, released on Vitamin Records in 2012. Its first songs were written in Melbourne, with the rest completed while the band toured in Canada. The album liner notes contained no songwriter credits, although "Round the Twist" was a version of the theme song of the children's television show of the same name.

Track listing 

"Birdy" – 2:16
"Over the Sun" – 3:15
"Barcelona" – 3:39
"Supergirl" – 4:39
"Flowers" – 3:57
"Like Snow" – 3:46
"Lonely People" – 4:04
"Foolish Child" – 3:16
"Round the Twist" – 3:17
"Lamb" – 3:37
"Tattoo on Her Wrist" – 5:23

Personnel
Emily Lubitz – vocals, guitar
Jesse Lubitz – guitar, backing vocals
Alex Burkoy – violin, mandolin, guitar, bass, backing vocals
Daniel Farrugia – drums
Harry Angus – keyboards, backing vocals

References 

2012 albums
Tinpan Orange albums